Mordellistena nigrimaculata is a species of beetle in the genus Mordellistena of the family Mordellidae. It was described by Franciscolo in 1967.

References

Beetles described in 1967
nigrimaculata